Destiny Church is a New Zealand fundamentalist, Christian pentecostalist movement that has its headquarters in Auckland, and is politically placed on the far-right. The church advocates strict adherence to biblical morality, and has a reputation for its position against homosexuality, for its patriarchal views and for its calls for a return to biblical conservative family values and morals. It also teaches prosperity theology and, more recently, COVID-19 conspiracy theories, the latter of which includes the denial of the virus' existence altogether.

Led by Brian Tamaki, whose actions and rhetoric have attracted criticism from the New Zealand media and from other public figures, Destiny Church has sponsored a nationwide rally against civil unions, issued a DVD which labels the Government of New Zealand as "evil", ordained Tamaki as bishop over all local Destiny churches, and held a gathering of 700 men who swore a "covenant"
oath of allegiance, obedience, and deference to Tamaki.

The church has led a strong campaign that opposes COVID-19 vaccination, lockdowns and mask mandates since the pandemic began in New Zealand, and are currently engaging in sporadically violent protests against mandates at Parliament. These actions have led to Destiny Church being condemned worldwide, Tamaki being briefly imprisoned for breaching bail conditions as he took part in an anti-vaccination protest in Christchurch. In 2022, Destiny Church's tax-free charity status was revoked.

Organization

Leadership

Destiny Church is led by Brian Tamaki and his wife Hannah Tamaki, who hold the positions of Visionary and Senior Ministers. Their three adult children Jasmine, Jamie, and Samuel are all actively involved in the church ministry. Samuel and his wife pastor the Destiny church in Gold Coast Australia, Jamie and her husband are the CEO of ManUp and Legacy International, Jasmine and her husband facilitate social services within the ManUp and Legacy organisation. Brian and Hannah have 5 generations of their family in Destiny Church. Following a unanimous agreement by the then 19 other pastors of Destiny Churches throughout New Zealand, Tamaki was ordained as a "bishop" during a ceremony performed by kaumatua and Destiny Pastor. Manuel Renata on 18 June 2005.

The church's leadership encourage obedience to its teachings and its rhetoric has sometimes alienated other churches that have different approaches to Christianity. In 2003, Tamaki, in what he described as a prophetic utterance, predicted that Destiny would be "ruling the nation" within five years.

Ministry
The church claims to provide not only biblical guidance and teaching but also a range of social services including budget advice, family and parenting advice, support for drug and alcohol abusers, anger management and resolution, provision of food and housing. The church also operates a composite school (catering for both primary and secondary students) which uses the Cambridge education system alongside the New Zealand curriuculm. Church services are energetic and have a Pentecostal worship style. The preaching and teaching is strongly conservative, literalist interpretation of Biblical teachings. Its membership is predominantly Māori and Polynesian, intergenerational, and from all levels of the socio-economic sections of New Zealand society. Brian Tamaki is himself Māori, and the church has been identified as part of the Māori cultural renaissance of recent years.

Locations
Destiny Church is located in South Auckland, New Zealand. The current site is in Wiri, and houses the church auditorium and its administration offices, a chapel, a multipurpose room, a fitness/boxing gym, a medical center, an early childhood center and school. The church began in Rotorua as "Lake City Church", which had a membership of 20 people. Within two years, it had grown to 300 members. Over the years, Destiny churches were established in the following locations:

At its peak in 2003, Destiny Church had a network of 19 church branches throughout New Zealand, with a total membership in excess of 5,000. By June 2012 it had 11 remaining branches, with around 3000 regular attendees. Church branches have closed in Porirua, Wanganui and Dunedin. By June 2013, Destiny Church Wanganui was no longer listed on the main church website. In addition, other branches such as Kaitaia, Opotiki, Taumarunui, and Hawkes Bay had either closed down or merged with other church branches.

Broadcasting
Destiny TV, a televangelist ministry, launched in 2001 and produced 30-minute programmes that ran every weekday morning on New Zealand's national television broadcaster.  The programmes were funded by donations from Destiny Church members.  TVNZ ceased to broadcast the programme in late 2004 just after the formation of the Destiny New Zealand political party. , Destiny TV still operates as the video production arm of Destiny Church. Weekly Destiny TV programmes are available for streaming on Destiny Church's website.

History

Origins
The Destiny Church movement was founded in 1998 from 20 members of Lake City Church in Rotorua, initially calling itself City Church Auckland. Destiny Church was founded by Brian Tamaki and his wife Hannah Tamaki, who continue to serve as Visionary and Senior Ministers of Destiny Church. Destiny Church had a close relationship with New Birth Missionary Baptist Church in Atlanta, USA, the church of Bishop Eddie Long. In his autobiography Tamaki described meeting Long, "my spiritual father", in 2002. Historian Peter Lineham has compared Destiny Church's liturgy progression away from orthodox Christianity to the late 1920's Ratana movement's divergence and eventual excommunication. Lineham also notes the usages of the historic and strong belief within Christianity in Māoridom to promote his reach and teachings.

Enough is Enough rally
Destiny Church has campaigned for a return to what it considers to be "Christian moral values" in New Zealand society, particularly for the "sanctity of marriage between a husband and wife". In August 2004, Destiny members marched on Parliament under their "Enough is Enough" rally which drew 5000 protesters against civil unions legislation. The rally attracted considerable criticism. The black T-shirts and track-pants worn by many of the marchers prompted negative comparisons with Nazi storm-troopers in the New Zealand media. When the rally was in progress, Tamaki indicated that he did not want to be a politician, saying, "I have a higher calling than a politician, I am a man of God."

A second march occurred in Auckland along with the Christian Life Centre and the City Impact Churches on 5 March 2005.

Plans for a "Destiny City"
On 29 October 2008 it was reported that Destiny Church was planning on building a holy city in South Auckland. The report was based on comments made by Brian Tamaki at the church's 10th birthday celebration, and released on DVD, where he talks about a  site the church had procured, with a budget of $2.4m. He said the community would have its own maraes and medical facilities and that "every child of every member of this church will never go to a state school again".

The church subsequently denied the report, a spokesperson saying they only intended to build a new headquarters and supply "social help" programmes, despite Rotorua's Daily Post quoting Tamaki as saying Destiny planned to create a "city within a city" in 2006.

At the Church's 2012 annual conference in Rotorua, Tamaki presented plans including a library, bookshop, early childhood centre, three schools and a university and encouraged tithing, saying "I don't care what the media say, I don't care what your relatives say, I don't care what the world says, nobody should be not tithing."

Momentum conference and pledge of allegiance
In October 2009, about 700 male members of the church attended a conference called "MoMENtum" in which Tamaki likened himself to King David. Attendees swore a "covenant oath" of loyalty and obedience to Tamaki and were given a "covenant ring" to wear on their right hands. A document entitled Protocols & Requirements Between Spiritual Father & His Spiritual Sons contains the oath:

The document asserts Tamaki's authority as "Bishop" and "spiritual father" of the church he founded. Another section, "Conduct Towards Bishop", states that "Bishop is the tangible expression of God", instructs the "sons" to follow numerous protocols, to defer to Tamaki with unquestioning loyalty and obedience, to follow his dress code, and to never tolerate criticism.

Public profile

Political activities
Richard Lewis, a member of Destiny Church Auckland, formed the Destiny New Zealand political party in 2003. The party first ran candidates in 2005.  Candidates from four different churches joined with candidates who came from Destiny Church.  Despite Tamaki's prediction that the church would rule New Zealand by 2008, the party's 42 candidates gained only 0.6 percent of the vote. This fell well short of the five percent threshold required to enter Parliament without an electorate MP but proved the best performance of any party that failed to enter Parliament.
In 2007, City Impact Church and Destiny Church collaborated in the establishment of the "Family Party", but the latter won just 0.35% of the party vote in New Zealand's 2008 general election and dissolved in 2010.

Māori community
Destiny Church recognises and celebrates Māori as tangata whenua ("People of the Land"). It also regards itself as an "iwi-tapu" or a spiritual tribe of God's people set aside as a chosen people and a holy nation, citing a scriptural premise from 1 Peter 2:9. In 2008, Destiny Church sought to claim urban Māori status so that they could serve Māori congregants who were disconnected from their tribes. Māori broadcaster and urban Māori advocate Willie Jackson supported Destiny's proposal by arguing that Tamaki and Destiny Church had changed the lives of thousands of former Māori criminals, fraudsters, and drug dealers for the better. Destiny's socially conservative position on gay rights and women drew opposition from various sectors including Prime Minister Helen Clark.

In October 2008, Destiny Church was awarded Urban Māori Authority status and Te Rūnanga a Iwi o Te Oranga Ake was incorporated to serve as the church's service provider arm. In 2011, Destiny Church received funding from the Ministry of Social Development for four Community Max programmes to help 79 youths in Auckland, Waikato, and the Bay of Plenty transition into full-time employment. However, Destiny Church struggled to receive government funding for other projects including a charter school. As a result, the Church has had to fund its own community services programme including the "Man Up" programme to help men become better fathers, husbands, and leaders in their own families and communities.

ManUp and legacy
Caine and Jamie Warren, elders of Destiny Church, founded "Man Up" in 2015. It offers a programme developed by Bishop Brian and Pastor Hannah Tamaki. The programme claims success in reducing the over-representation of Maori men in every negative statistic in New Zealand and in restoring the mana of men who have lost their sense of identity and purpose. Anecdotal evidence tells of changed individuals. ManUp Director Caine Warren told TVNZ that all men are welcome. ManUp involves everyday men from all walks of life meeting in small groups once a week throughout a 15-week time-commitment. Alongside ManUp, Destiny Church offers similar groups and programmes developed to support, empower and encourage woman (Legacy) and youth (Boys2Men, Legacy Diamonds).

In February 2019 Tamaki met with Minister of Justice Andrew Little to discuss giving Destiny Church's Man Up program permission to participate in prison rehabilitation. Tamaki has also sought access to government grants for rehabilitation programs and access to prisoners. In a media interview, Little stated that he did not anticipate Man Up indoctrinating more followers into the church, just as (for example) the Salvation Army and the Presbyterian Church do not.

Tamaki clashed with the New Zealand Government in April 2019 over introducing Man Up into prisons, threatening "inmate revolts in every prison" and suggesting that ministers had subjected him to "a political gang rape". Corrections Minister Kelvin Davis stated that no "independent reputable evidence" endorsed the Man Up programme and that Tamaki had not applied and gone "through a process to get a programme into prisons".

Controversies

Opposition to homosexuality
Destiny Church and its leader Brian Tamaki have been known for their vocal opposition to homosexuality. On 23 August 2004, Destiny Church organized a large public rally known as the "Enough is Enough" march in Wellington to oppose the Fifth Labour Government's proposed Civil Union Act. For the march, Destiny Church members wore black shirts emblazoned with the slogan "Enough is Enough." The march generated considerable media and public attention with critics such as Labour MPs Georgina Beyer and David Benson-Pope likening the marchers to Nazis.

Bishop Tamaki attracted controversy when he blamed the 2010 and 2011 Christchurch earthquakes on sinful behavior such as murder and homosexuality during a sermon on 16 November 2016. These statements preceded the 2016 Kaikoura earthquake by a few hours. Tamaki's remarks were condemned by several leading New Zealand public figures including the Mayor of Christchurch Bob Parker, Prime Minister John Key, and the Anglican bishop of Dunedin, Kelvin Wright. One Auckland-based critic Aaron Smithson also organized a Change.org petition calling for the revocation of Destiny Church's tax-free status.

On Saturday 1 June 2019, Bishop Brian Tamaki formally apologised to all homosexual people of his conduct in the past. The event where this apology took place was at the Stand conference in Destiny church Auckland. He invited his good friend Jevan Goulter who spoke on the matters as well as influential homosexual figures. Brian stated that all homosexuals, bisexuals and transgenders were welcome to his church.

Political and religious views
On his website "New Zealand: A Nation Under Siege" (bishoptamaki.org.nz) Tamaki declared the government of New Zealand to be "inherently evil", pointing out that some members of Parliament chose not to swear on the Bible, and one (Ashraf Choudhary) swore on the Qur'an, when being sworn into government. In a June 2005 interview, Tamaki said Destiny was ready to wage war on "secular humanism, liberalism, relativism, pluralism", on "a Government gone evil", on the "modern-day witchcraft" of the media, and on the "radical homosexual agenda".

Tithing
Tithing is common practice in Destiny Church.

Media articles using former Destiny Church members as sources have alleged that Tamaki's has an outspoken autocratic style and highlighted the church's frequent appeals for tithe contributions, and its insular culture. The Sunday Star Times highlighted Tamaki's visible wealth and personal luxury, questioning its consistency with the church's tithing system. Church pastors agree to a restraint of trade that applies in the event that they withdraw as pastors.

In March 2010, the church's Brisbane pastor resigned over a difference in doctrine. 25 members of the congregation followed him out of the church, some expressed their support for him to the media, saying that the church was a money-making cult.

On 29 August 2017, Destiny Church co-founder and senior pastor Hannah Tamaki attracted media attention for purchasing a new Mercedes-Benz AMG GLE63 S SUV worth NZ$207,900. This coincided with reports that the Charities Services was considering stripping three of Destiny Church's charities of their charitable status for failing to file returns. Some critics have regarded these expenses as extravagant luxuries that come at the expense of church members.

Cult allegations
Following members taking a voluntary covenant pledge to Bishop Brian and the cause of Destiny Church, the church was labelled as a cult by several New Zealand media outlets and other observers.

In an interview with TVNZ, Mark Vrankovich of Cultwatch criticised the covenant, saying Mr Tamaki was "taking a kingship position", and

In the same interview following the reports of October 2009, Bishop Tamaki and Richard Lewis defended the pledge on the basis that it was taken willingly, and simply attempted to set standards and codify established practice within the church. Lewis denied the "cult" claims, noting that church services are open to the public. Tamaki denied the existence of a "cult of personality", saying that he was simply setting a visible example for men to follow; and that the church helps a lot of people from difficult backgrounds.

Campbell Live, a current affairs programme, made use of a covert camera and an unidentified witness to critique church practices and the Momentum conference. The church later issued a response, stating that "a number of comments made by the individual were grossly inaccurate", that the source was not credible, and the report reflected "poor practice".

In a separate report Peter Lineham, associate professor at Massey University, expressed similar concerns but stopped short of using the word 'cult':

Cult allegations resurfaced in 2010, when Cultwatch accused Tamaki of denying the bodily resurrection of Jesus, the claims and Tamaki's denial of the cult status generated substantial media coverage.

Alleged sexual assault
In late March 2010, controversy arose over allegations against two adult children of Destiny Church Taranaki Pastors Robyn and Lee Edmonds. Charges were withdrawn by Police as there was no evidence. The pastors resigned from Destiny Church Taranaki leadership.

Revocation of tax-exempt status
Allegedly more than 100,000 people had signed a petition calling for the New Zealand Government to revoke Destiny Church's tax-free status, reports say that this petition was in response to Tamaki's remarks blaming gays for the 2010 and 2011 Christchurch earthquakes, and church co-founder Hannah Tamaki's purchase of a brand new Mercedes-Benz in mid-August 2017.

In early October 2017, the Department of Internal Affairs issued notice to remove two of Destiny Church's biggest charities, Destiny International Trust and Te Hahi o Nga Matamua Holdings, of their charitable status. Destiny Church took immediate legal action and subsequently to date they still retain their charitable status with the Department of Internal Affairs.

In late October 2019, the High Court restored the charitable status of Destiny International Trust and Te Hāhi o Ngā Mātāmua Holdings. Destiny's lawyer Ron Mansfield confirmed that the two charities were complying with the law.

In February 2022, the Department of Internal Affairs delisted four Destiny-link charities for failing to file their annual returns by 31 December 2021.

COVID-19 pandemic
During the COVID-19 pandemic in New Zealand, Destiny Church courted media attention when Bishop Tamaki announced that his movement would not close their churches in response to Government directives discouraging large gatherings of more than 100 people. In a statement on 15 March 2020, Tamaki stated that "I'm not about to let a filthy virus scare us out of having church. To equate fear with common sense is nonsense." Tamaki's stance was criticised by infectious diseases expert Dr Siouxsie Wiles, who remarked that "people like [Tamaki], former politicians, entrepreneurs are all coming out and saying all sorts of nonsense, rather than being supportive of how we're going to get through this... Instead of [Tamaki] saying 'how can we help keep New Zealanders safe', he's just stating stuff when he actually does not know anything." While Destiny Church held services on 22 March, it took precautionary steps including encouraging the sick and elderly to stay at home, having health checks, and separated 19 rooms into eight zones to manage crowd numbers. As of 28 March, Destiny Church has discontinued physical services but shifted to livestreaming sermons on its website, Facebook Live, and YouTube.

In mid–2020, Tamaki announced that Destiny Church would be holding services despite the Government's alert level two restrictions limiting private gatherings including religious services to 10 people. Tamaki described the Government as "controlling parents" and called on churches to join him in opposing these restrictions as a breach of rights.

In early October 2021, The New Zealand Herald reported that Destiny Church had received a total of NZ$127,903.20 in wage subsidies including $91,384.80 for its 13 employees in Auckland and $36,518.40 for six in Hamilton. On 2 October, Bishop Tamaki had organised an anti-lockdown protest, which attracted 2,000 people including families with young babies. Tamaki was subsequently charged with breaching the COVID-19 Public Health Response Act 2020 and the Alert Level 3 Order.

In early November 2021, Destiny Church admitted that it played a central role in leading the anti-lockdown group The Freedoms & Rights Coalition (TFRC), which had organised nationwide anti-lockdown protests, but denied making money from the Coalition's merchandise. According to Stuff, the TFRC's web domain was owned by Jenny Marshall, the church's director of operations and Brian Tamaki's assistant. The Coalition's website solicited donations and sold merchandise including t-shirts, flags and facemasks emblazoned with anti-lockdown messaging. Marshall also confirmed that Brian Tamaki regarded himself as the "founder and architect" of the movement but claimed that the Coalition's merchandising was separate from Destiny Church's finances. In addition, Stuff reported that Brian and Hannah Tamaki maintained links with Groundswell NZ's Pukekohe and Auckland coordinator Scott Bright, who donated vegetables to the TFRC and participated in an anti-lockdown protest in his personal capacity.

In late November 2021, Radio New Zealand reported that Destiny Church had leased its carpark in Wiri, Auckland for the Whānau Ora Community Clinic's testing operations. The Whānau Ora clinic, which has vaccinated tens of thousands of people at its Takanini mass vaccination centre, is owned by two prominent Destiny Church members Raewyn Bhana and George Ngatai.

See also
Religion in New Zealand
Christianity in New Zealand
Christian politics in New Zealand
Māori religion

References

Further reading

External links
 Official website, New Zealand
 Destiny Church, Brisbane, Queensland, Australia

Christian organizations established in 1998
Pentecostal denominations in Oceania
Fundamentalist denominations
Anti-abortion organisations in New Zealand
Organisations based in Auckland
Christianity in Auckland
Christian denominations in Australia
Christian denominations in New Zealand
Pentecostal churches in New Zealand